Norman Douglas Barkley (born January 6, 1937) is a Canadian former professional ice hockey defenceman. He played in the National Hockey League with the Chicago Black Hawks and Detroit Red Wings between 1957 and 1966. After his playing career he was the head coach of the Red Wings from 1970 to 1971 and again between 1975 and 1976.

Playing career
Barkley's playing career ended from an on-ice accident that rendered him blind in his right eye. On January 30, 1966, Barkley, playing for the Detroit Red Wings, was battling with Chicago's Doug Mohns for a puck at the blueline. Mohns attempted to lift Barkley's stick, but missed, and struck the bent-over Barkley directly in his right eye. Barkley would never play again. In 253 NHL games Barkley recorded 24 goals and 80 assists for 104 career points.

Coaching career
Following his career-ending injury, Barkley joined the Detroit front office, working in public relations and as a troubleshooter. In 1969 he was appointed head coach of the Fort Worth Wings of the Central Hockey League (Detroit's top farm team), and on January 10, 1971, Barkley was promoted to head coach of the Detroit Red Wings. He coached less than one year before being replaced by Johnny Wilson following a 3-8-0 start to the 1971–72 season. Barkley returned to coach the Wings again in 1975, but lasted just 26 games before being fired and replaced by Alex Delvecchio, a former teammate.

Barkley now lives in Calgary, Alberta.

Career statistics

Regular season and playoffs

NHL coaching record

References

External links
 

1937 births
Living people
Buffalo Bisons (AHL) players
Calgary Flames announcers
Calgary Stampeders (WHL) players
Canadian ice hockey defencemen
Chicago Blackhawks players
Detroit Red Wings coaches
Detroit Red Wings players
Ice hockey people from Alberta
National Hockey League broadcasters
Sportspeople from Lethbridge